Johann Georg Reiffenstuel (1641–1703) was a Canon law expert.

He was born in Kaltenbrunn, Bavaria, and died in Freising, Bavaria. He was a member of the Franciscan (Reformed) Order, and was chosen definitor of his province. He taught philosophy at Freising, Landshut, and Munich, and Canon law at Freising. His works on moral theology and Canon law give him first rank among the canonists of his time, and have gone through numerous editions, with additions by other authors.

1641 births
1703 deaths